Sidewalk Labs is an urban planning and infrastructure subsidiary of Google. Its stated goal is to improve urban infrastructure through technological solutions, and tackle issues such as cost of living, efficient transportation and energy usage. The company was headed by Daniel L. Doctoroff, former Deputy Mayor of New York City for economic development and former chief executive of Bloomberg L.P. until 2021. Other notable employees include Craig Nevill-Manning, co-founder of Google's New York office and inventor of Froogle, and Rohit Aggarwala, who served as chief policy officer of the company and is now Commissioner of New York City Department of Environmental Protection. It was originally part of Alphabet Inc., Google's parent company, before being absorbed into Google in 2021 following Doctoroff's departure from the company due to a suspected ALS diagnosis.

Projects

Sidewalk Toronto 

In April 2016, The Information reported that Sidewalk intended to create a new city in the United States to test design ideas prior to real world implementation. Sidewalk did not confirm that report, but has said it had engaged in thought experiments about what it could be like to develop a community "from the internet up."

In October 2017, Sidewalk Labs announced plans to develop Quayside, a  neighborhood in Toronto, Ontario, Canada, in response to a competition organized by Waterfront Toronto. Branded as Sidewalk Toronto, the project aims to become "a testbed for emerging technologies, materials and processes" to address issues such as sustainability, accessibility, inclusiveness and prosperity in urban communities. The initiative is also envisioned to be scaled up across Toronto's Port Lands, an  area that is one of the largest areas of underdeveloped urban land in North America. The project progressed slowly with ongoing consultation from the public.

In 2018, the company opened a new Toronto office and began holding weekend open houses in which visitors from the public contributed their ideas to the development of the Sidewalk Toronto project. In 2019, Sidewalk Labs said it had consulted thousands of Torontonians for its development plans. However, representatives of Waterfront Toronto's Digital Strategy Advisory Panel (DSAP) said that Sidewalk Labs's projects contained too much "tech for tech's sake."

In May 2020, the project was abandoned due to the economic uncertainty posed by the COVID-19 pandemic.

Development Advisory Services 
Sidewalk Labs offers advisory services for real estate developers to use technology to meet environmental, affordability, and equity goals. Sidewalk Labs has advised on the following four projects:

 Mana Wynwood — a 23.5–acre project in Miami that will serve as a trade center between Latin America and China and an arts and entertainment center
 Downtown Summerlin — a 300–acre mixed-use development with minimalized parking in Las Vegas
 The Power Station — a 29–acre mixed-use residential community on the waterfront in San Francisco at the site of a former electrical plant
 Vancouver Innovation Center — conversion of a 180–acre industrial manufacturing site into a mixed-use residential and commercial community in the Portland/Vancouver area

Traffic flow in the United States 
In early 2016, Sidewalk Labs began working with ten cities which participated in the U.S. Department of Transportation's "Smart Cities Challenge" to help cities better understand daily street activity through the use of real-time data. The Challenge attracted dozens of medium-sized cities across the US to compete for $40 million in federal funding along with an additional $10 million from the Paul G. Allen Family Foundation to assess road data gathered from smartphones to analyze congestion and other traffic conditions, and develop a transportation coordination platform to improve the efficiency of road, parking, and transit use. The winner, Columbus, Ohio, was announced in June 2016.

Products 

 Mesa, launched in September 2020, is a tool to help commercial buildings use energy more efficiently.

 Delve, launched in October 2020, is a tool to help developers, architects and urban designers discover optimal design choices for neighborhood projects.

 Pebble, launched in May 2021, is a tool to help manage parking in cities.

Investments and portfolio companies 
Sidewalk Labs invests in and incubates companies which develop tools that can support Sidewalk Labs initiatives and scale to cities around the world.

Intersection and Link 

In June 2015, Sidewalk Labs led a group of investors in the acquisition of Control Group and Titan forming a new company called Intersection. Intersection works in cities and public spaces to offer internet connectivity, information, and content.

Cityblock 
Cityblock Health was spun-out of Sidewalk Labs in 2017. Its goal is to improve health care for low-income people with difficult medical needs. It employs over 500 people and has
patients in three US states and Washington, DC.

Coord 
In 2018, Sidewalk Labs introduced a spin-off Coord, a company focused on providing RESTful APIs for accessing information like routing, bike share details, toll information, and curbside details. In October 2018, Coord raised an additional $5 million to continue building products.

Replica 
Replica is an AI-powered data platform which helps cities make operational or infrastructural changes in response to changes in population behaviors. It began as a project at Sidewalk Labs in 2017 and was spun out as an independent company in 2019.

Sidewalk Infrastructure Partners (SIP) 
Sidewalk Infrastructure Partners (SIP) was spun-off from Sidewalk Labs in 2019 to develop technologies that modernize infrastructure such as recycling, waste disposal and transportation in communities throughout the United States.

Ori 
Sidewalk Labs invested in Boston-based robotic home interior design company Ori in 2019.

Nico 
The Neighborhood Investment Company (Nico) allows local residents to make small, long-term real estate investments in their own neighborhoods. Sidewalk Labs invested in Nico at the end of 2019.

VoltServer 
In late 2019, Sidewalk Labs invested in VoltServer, which strives to "make electricity safe" and overlays data on electricity distribution.

The Yellow Book 
Sidewalk Labs provides a coffee table book to employees known as The Yellow Book, which contains aspirational designs of a futurist city run on its technology. In the book, the company proposes expanding its scope to include the power to levy taxes, control public services such as schools, roads, and public transportation, collect data on the current and past locations of all members of the community, and to help redesign the local criminal justice system. The book also describes a social credit system to reward "good behavior", a system which has been compared by some to the one used in China. Sidewalk's proposed system also included rewards for sharing personal data.

The book also includes the potential real estate profitability of such investments, containing theoretical proposals for communities in Detroit, Denver, and Alameda, California. The company has described this book as a "wide-ranging brainstorming process", and stated that most of its ideas were never considered for the Toronto project.

References

External links 
 

Companies based in New York City
Companies based in Manhattan
Google